René Cardaliaguet (1875–1950) was a French priest and journalist. He was born in Quimper, and died in Bohars.

1875 births
1950 deaths
20th-century French Roman Catholic priests
Writers from Quimper